Kendall Gail Ryan (born August 10, 1992) is an American racing cyclist, who currently rides for American amateur team L39ION of Los Angeles. She rode at the 2014 UCI Road World Championships. She is the sister of fellow racing cyclist Alexis Ryan.

In May 2018 she won the first stage of the Amgen Tour of California, eventually coming third in the sprint standings for the race. In 2019 she won the Women's Pro race at the 2019 Air Force Association Cycling Classic.

Major results

2009
 1st Dana Point Grand Prix
 1st Stage 3 San Dimas Stage Race
2010
 1st Dana Point Grand Prix
 3rd Nevada City Classic
 7th GP Cento - Carnevale d'Europa
 9th Scotts Valley Grand Prix
 9th Sacramento Grand Prix
 10th Road race, UCI Juniors Road World Championships
 10th GP Liberazione
2011
 5th Merced Criterium
 6th Sandy Springs Cycling Challenge
 7th Snelling Road Race
 7th Wilmington Grand Prix
 7th Athens Twilight Criterium
 8th Spartanburg Regional Classic
 8th Downtown Walterboro Criterium
 8th Presbyterian Hospital Invitational Criterium
2012
 1st Electric City Circuit
 1st Stage 2 Tour de Murrieta
 4th Spartanburg Regional Classic
 5th Presbyterian Hospital Invitational Criterium
 6th Chevron Manhattan Beach Grand Prix
 7th Herman Miller Grand Cycling Classic
 8th Criterium, National Road Championships
 9th Air Force Cycling Classic
2014
 1st Gaffney Criterium
 2nd Overall Air Force Association Cycling Classic
 2nd Glencoe Grand Prix
 3rd Spartanburg Regional Classic
 3rd Downtown Walterboro Criterium
 3rd Historic Roswell Criterium
 4th Chevron Manhattan Beach Grand Prix
 5th Overall Tour of America's Dairyland
2nd East Troy Cycling Classic
3rd Shorewood Criterium Cycling Classic
4th ISCorp Downer Classic
7th Commonwealth Classic Fond du Lac
 6th Overall Tour de Murrieta
 6th Wilmington Grand Prix
2015
 National Road Championships
1st  Criterium
3rd Team time trial
 2nd Overall Air Force Association Cycling Classic
 2nd Novant Health Invitational Criterium
 3rd Dana Point Grand Prix
 6th Overall Tour of Utah
 7th Grand Prix cycliste de Gatineau
2016
 3rd Overall Air Force Association Cycling Classic
 4th Mayor's Cup Boston
2017
 1st Overall The Gateway Cup
1st Stage 3
 1st White Spot / Delta Road Race
 1st PoCo Grand Prix
 1st Gastown Grand Prix
 1st Dana Point Grand Prix
 1st Stage 3 Valley of the Sun Stage Race
 3rd Grand Prix Cycliste de Gatineau
 3rd Glencoe Grand Prix
 3rd Sunny King Criterium
 4th Overall Tour de Murrieta
1st Stage 2
 4th Armed Forces Association Cycling Classic
 5th Criterium, National Road Championships
 5th McClellan Road Race
2018
 1st Overall Armed Forces Association Cycling Classic
1st Stage 2
 1st White Spot / Delta Road Race
 1st Stage 1 Tour of California
 1st Stage 3 Valley of the Sun Stage Race
 3rd Towards Zero Race Melbourne
 Sea Otter Classic
3rd Criterium
10th Road race
 7th Sunny King Criterium
2019
 10th White Spot / Delta Road Race

References

External links
 
 

1992 births
Living people
American female cyclists
People from Ventura, California
21st-century American women